Susanne Ferschl (born 10 March 1973) is a German politician. Born in Schwaz, she represents The Left. Susanne Ferschl has served as a member of the Bundestag from the state of Bavaria since 2017.

Life 
Susanne Ferschl grew up in the Allgäu region and finished school in 1992 with the Abitur. This was followed by training as a chemical laboratory assistant at the Nestlé factory in Biessenhofen. Later she also completed degrees as a business coach (of the Chamber of Industry and Commerce) and as a business mediator. In 2006, she was elected Chair of the Central Works Council of Nestlé Deutschland AG, as well as a member of the European Works Council and the Supervisory Board. She became member of the Bundestag after the 2017 German federal election. She is a member of the Committee for Labour and Social Affairs. She is the vice-chair of her group.

References

External links 

  
 Bundestag biography 

1973 births
Living people
Members of the Bundestag for Bavaria
Female members of the Bundestag
21st-century German women politicians
Members of the Bundestag 2017–2021
Members of the Bundestag 2021–2025
Members of the Bundestag for The Left
People from Schwaz
Works councillors